The War of 1812 was a military conflict between the United States of America and the British Empire.

War of 1812 may also refer to:
 War of 1812 (Russia), the French invasion of Russia
 War of 1812 campaigns, a synopsis of the land campaigns of the North American War of 1812
 War of 1812 (board game), a 1973 board wargame by Gamma Two Games (now Columbia Games)
 War of 1812 Monument, a memorial located in Ottawa, Canada

See also
Origins of the War of 1812
Bibliography of the War of 1812
List of War of 1812 Bicentennial
Anglo-Swedish War (1810–1812)
Anglo-Russian War (1807–1812)
"1812 Overture", a musical work by Tchaikovsky
Peninsular War (1808–1814)
Russo-Persian War (1804–1813)
Russo-Turkish War (1806–1812)
The Naval War of 1812, a book by Theodore Roosevelt
War of 1812 museum (disambiguation)
Category:Conflicts in 1812